The Yankee hurricane of 1935 was a rare Category 2 hurricane that affected the Bahamas and South Florida in November. It strengthened to a hurricane on November 1, initially posing a threat to the Carolinas. Subsequently, the cyclone turned southwest. It attained its peak intensity on November 3, and it made landfall near Miami Beach on November 4. The hurricane's unusual approach toward Florida and late arrival earned it the nickname of the Yankee Hurricane.

Meteorological history

The cyclone originated as an extratropical system east of Hamilton, Bermuda. The system was isolated from a large upper-level trough that stretched from the Lesser Antilles to a low pressure area near the Faroe Islands. A polar ridge of high pressure was situated north of Bermuda, producing anomalous easterly trades at an unusually high latitude. The easterly flow blew over a long fetch of open waters, thus producing low-level convergence. Gradually, instability probably supported convective activity, and the cyclone slowly acquired tropical characteristics.

Initially, the cyclone moved westward. The tropical cyclone temporarily threatened the Carolinas. The cyclone turned south, under the influence of northerly winds from a high pressure system. On November 3, a ship reported a minimum pressure of 964 mbar (28.48 inHg) north of the Abaco Islands.

The hurricane traversed southern Florida and weakened over land. Later, the cyclone entered the Gulf of Mexico north of Cape Sable. On November 6, the tropical system weakened to a strong tropical storm, and it turned northwest. On November 7, the circulation turned east, and the cyclone weakened to a remnant low pressure area.

Preparations
Shops and residences were "boarded up" in Nassau. Precautionary hurricane signals were hoisted along the Florida east coast from Titusville to Miami, and the center was expected to make landfall between Miami and West Palm Beach. Later, hurricane warnings were issued from Palm Beach to Naples. 200 men were evacuated from the Snake Creek area in the upper Florida Keys. Workers in the Florida Keys were transported to concentration points in Miami and Homestead. Maritime interests in the Gulf of Mexico were also warned, though the cyclone's remnants remained off the west coast of Florida.

Impact
The duration of hurricane-force winds ranged from 1–3 hours in the Abaco Islands, and five sponge fishing vessels were lost due to the hurricane. The cyclone caused 14 deaths in the islands. In Fort Lauderdale, winds unroofed several homes, and canals overflowed. In South Florida, the hurricane dismantled communication lines, and "telegraph companies relayed" messages via Jacksonville and Atlanta. High waves flooded Miami Beach.  of the Miami Beach causeway was eroded, and police halted traffic between Miami Beach and the mainland. The death toll in Florida was low because of well executed warnings and advisories. Winds shattered numerous plate glass windows in Miami's business district, while signs, roofing materials, and vegetation littered streets. 50 homes lost their roofs in Hollywood and Dania, and the oceanfront boardwalk was destroyed. Precipitation damaged equipment at the Hollywood Beach Hotel, where many windows were broken. Construction standards were improved in the aftermath of the 1928 Okeechobee Hurricane, reducing damages in subsequent storms. 35 people were treated for injuries at local hospitals. Five deaths were reported in Florida. Total damages in Florida reached $5,500,000 in the Miami–Fort Lauderdale area.

See also

List of Florida hurricanes
Hurricane Nicole (2022) - took a similar track at a similar point in the year

References

Yankee
1935
Y (1935)
1935 Yankee hurricane
1935 Yankee hurricane
1935 natural disasters in the United States